Barbecued pork may refer to:
Smoked pork, in one of a number of regional variations of barbecue in the United States
Bakkwa, a southern Chinese meat preservation method whereby meat is either minced and formed into thin squares, or cleanly sliced from blocks of solid meat.
Barbacoa or Carnitas, a Mexican method of meat preparation, including pork.
Char siu, a Cantonese meat preparation method involving long strips of boneless pork with a coating of seasonings which turn the meat dark red after cooking
Babi panggang, a specific Indonesian Batak means of cooking pork.

See also 

 Barbecue
 Regional variations of barbecue